Psilocybe subcubensis is an entheogenic species of mushroom in the family Hymenogastraceae. The mushroom contains the medicinal compounds psilocybin and psilocin. Psilocybe subcubensis was first described by Mexican mycologist Gaston Guzman. It is the pantropical sister species of Psilocybe cubensis. It is macroscopically identical to P. cubensis but has smaller spores.

See also
List of Psilocybin mushrooms
Psilocybin mushrooms
Psilocybe

References

Entheogens
Psychoactive fungi
subcubensis
Psychedelic tryptamine carriers
Taxa named by Gastón Guzmán